Robert W. Duplessie is an American politician and firefighter from Maine. Duplessie, grew up in North Vassalboro, Maine and graduated from Winslow High School.  A Democrat, served from 1998 to 2006 in the Maine House of Representatives, where he represented a portion of Westbrook. During his first two terms, he served on the    Natural Resources Committee and during his final two terms, Duplessie served as Assistant Majority Leader of the House of Representatives. He was succeeded in District 125 by fellow Democrat Ann Peoples.

Duplessie worked as a firefighter in neighboring Portland for 28 year prior to serving in the Legislature. He was also President of the Professional Fire Fighters of Maine, IAFF, for 15 years and served for 22 years on the Maine AFL-CIO Executive Board.         In January 2007, a month after leaving the Legislature, Duplessie was hired by the Maine Department of Conservation as assistant to the commissioner. Now retired on his tree farm in Andover, Maine and serves on the Mahoosuc Land Trust Board of Directors & chairs the Lands Committee.

References 

Year of birth missing (living people)
Living people
Politicians from Westbrook, Maine
Democratic Party members of the Maine House of Representatives
American firefighters
Trade unionists from Maine